Lawrence Marston   (June 8, 1857 – February 1, 1939) was an American actor, playwright, producer, stage director and film director.

Biography
Marston was born to a Jewish family in Hammerstadt, Bohemia, Austrian Empire (now Vlastějovice in the Czech Republic). Naturalized in Chicago, he lived mainly in New York City. After working as an actor, producer and director for the stage, he became a film director with the Biograph Studios.

His first wife was actress Lillian Lewis, who he married in 1888.

Marston's second wife Anna Cornelia Delves was billed as Mrs. Lawrence Marston. With her, he had his only daughter, Anna Lawrence Marston, who was baptized Catholic at age 12.

Lawrence Marston died February 1, 1939, in Manhattan. His ashes were interred into the mausoleum of Ferncliff Cemetery.

Works
Playwright
An Innocent Sinner (1896)
The Widow Goldstein (1897)
For Liberty and Love (1897)
The Helmet of Navarre (1901)
The Penitent (1902) from Hall Caine's novel A Son of Hagar
The Little Mother (1902)
A Remarkable Case (1902)
After Midnight (1904)
When the World Sleeps (1905)
Jeanne D'arc (1906)

Screenwriter
The Warfare of the Flesh (1917) scenario
The Border Legion (1918)
A Man of Iron (1925) adaptation

Stage director
The Monster (1922) play by Crane Wilbur
Death Takes a Holiday (1929) with Katharine Hepburn (both actress and director were fired during the run) 

Film director
 The Star of Bethlehem
The Evidence of the Film (1913) short
The Woman in Black (1914)
Under the Gaslight (1914) with Lionel Barrymore and Mrs. Lawrence Marston
The Marriage Bond (1916)
A Wall Street Tragedy (1916)

References

External links

1857 births
1939 deaths
19th-century American dramatists and playwrights
20th-century American dramatists and playwrights
19th-century American male actors
American male stage actors
American male screenwriters
American theatre directors
American male dramatists and playwrights
Film directors from Illinois
Male actors from Chicago
20th-century American male writers
Screenwriters from Illinois
20th-century American screenwriters
American people of Czech descent
American people of Czech-Jewish descent
Czech film directors